James Ketchum may refer to:
 James S. Ketchum (1931–2019), psychiatrist and United States Army Medical Corps officer
 James R. Ketchum, White House Curator